Apterosvercus is a genus of cricket in family Gryllidae and tribe Gryllini.  Species can be found in Indo-China (Vietnam only to date) and Malesia.

Taxonomy
The genus contains the following species:
Apterosvercus aequatorialis Gorochov, 2001 
Apterosvercus sylvestris Gorochov, 1992 - type species (A. sylvestris sylvestris)
Apterosvercus tembelingi Gorochov, 2001

References

Gryllinae
Orthoptera genera
Orthoptera of Indo-China